Kay Elizabeth Hull  (born 3 February 1954) is a former Australian politician who served as a National Party member of the House of Representatives from 1998 to 2010, representing the Division of Riverina in New South Wales.

Hull was born in Guyra, New South Wales, and was a small business owner and operator before entering politics. She was a councillor of the City of Wagga Wagga from 1991 to 1998. A small caricature of her is displayed on a Regional Express Saab 340 aircraft.

On 6 April 2010, Kay Hull announced that she wouldn't be contesting the next Federal election, after 12 years serving the Riverina electorate.

In April 2010, Charles Sturt University named the Kay Hull Veterinary Teaching Hospital in its South Campus in honour of Kay Hull.

In May 2010, Regional Express Airlines named the Kay Hull Conference Room at the Australian Airline Pilot Academy in honour of Kay Hull.

In March 2011, she was awarded the Freedom of the City by Wagga Wagga city council for her "tenacity, resilience, courage and conviction in her representation of her constituents." Hull was appointed a member of the Order of Australia in the 2015 Queen's Birthday Honours, and was promoted to Officer of the Order of Australia in the 2021 Queen's Birthday Honours.

References

1954 births
Living people
National Party of Australia members of the Parliament of Australia
Members of the Australian House of Representatives
Members of the Australian House of Representatives for Riverina
Officers of the Order of Australia
People from Wagga Wagga
Women members of the Australian House of Representatives
21st-century Australian politicians
21st-century Australian women politicians
20th-century Australian politicians
20th-century Australian women politicians